The Magyar Műszaki és Közlekedési Múzeum ("Hungarian Technical and Transportation Museum"), still often referred to with its former name, Közlekedési Múzeum ("Transportation Museum"), is a museum in Budapest, Hungary. It is one of Europe's oldest transportation collections.

The museum has a unique collection of locomotives and railway cars on a 1:5 scale. This means that a locomotive of, for example, 10 m length is reproduced with all details in a 2 m length model. The models represent a wide range of railway technology. The museum shows also a locomotive and wagon in real size with a railway station of the 1900s.

In other parts of the museum are shown:

 The history of road traffic: horse-drawn and machine-driven vehicles, road and bridge building with a collection of old cars, motorcycles and bicycles.
 The history of sailing. Sailing from the prehistoric ages; the history of Hungarian boat manufacturing, showed by models.
 On a location deeper in the park there is a permanent exhibition about the history of flight and space flight, including original Hungarian and foreign aircraft, including a Junkers F-13, the first all-metal transport aircraft.  It also has the cabin of the first Hungarian astronaut, Bertalan Farkas. The development of engines and instruments and modern rocket engineering techniques are demonstrated.

The history of city transportation shows the public traffic in Buda and Pest before the appearance of trams and omnibuses.

The museum also owns the collection of planes in Aeropark, an aviation museum dedicated to the history of Hungarian civil aviation, next to Budapest Ferenc Liszt International Airport.

Visitor information
 Address: 11 Városligeti körút, XIV Budapest 
Southeastern corner of City Park

The museum is temporarily closed due to reconstruction.  After  rebuilding, a completely new building will be erected for the renewed collection. For further information, please visit http://kozlekedesimuzeum.hu/

References

Sources

 Közlekedési Múzeum homepage

Museums in Budapest
B
Transport museums in Hungary
Ferenc Pfaff buildings